Natural Resources is a 1970 soul album released by Motown girl group Martha Reeves and the Vandellas on the Gordy (Motown) label. The album is significant for the Vietnam War ballad "I Should Be Proud" and the slow jam, "Love Guess Who". The album marked a return from lead singer Martha Reeves, recovering from a time in a mental institution after an addiction to painkillers nearly wrecked her (though it still took her until 1977 to beat her addiction). This was the next-to-last album for the Vandellas, whose success had peaked in the mid-1960s.

Track listing

Personnel
Martha Reeves - lead vocals; background vocals on "Everybody's Talking"
The Andantes - background vocals (side 1, tracks 2, 4, 5; side 2, tracks 2, 5 and 6)
Lois Reeves - backing vocals (side 1, track 1; side 2, track 5)
Sandra Tilley - background vocals (side 1, track 1; side 2, track 5)
Valerie Simpson - background vocals (side 2, track 4)
Nickolas Ashford - background vocals (side 2, track 4)
The Funk Brothers - instrumentation

References

1970 albums
Gordy Records albums
Martha and the Vandellas albums
Albums produced by Henry Cosby
Albums produced by Clarence Paul